Two Treaties of Örebro were signed on the same day, 18 July 1812, in Örebro, Sweden. Negotiated by the British minister-plenipotentiary in Sweden, Edward Thornton, they formally ended the Anglo-Russian War (1807–1812) and the Anglo-Swedish War (1810–1812), neither of which had seen serious military conflict.

Notes

Footnotes

References

External links

Örebro
Örebro
Örebro
Örebro
Örebro
Örebro
Örebro
1812 in Sweden
1812 in the Russian Empire
1812 in the United Kingdom
1812 in British law
July 1812 events
History of Örebro